Panchra railway station is a railway station of Andal–Sainthia branch line of the Asansol railway division connecting from  to Sainthia on the Sahibganj loop line. This is under the jurisdiction of Eastern Railway zone of Indian Railways. It is situated at Barakuri, Panchra, Birbhum district in the Indian state of West Bengal.

History
The Andal–Sainthia branch line was built in 1913. Electrification of Andal–Pandabeshwar section was completed in 2010–11 and Pandabeshwar-Saithia route including Panchra railway station was completed in 2016.

References

Railway stations in Birbhum district
Asansol railway division